Messyness is an American comedy clip show that premiered on MTV on August 23, 2021.  It is hosted by Nicole Polizzi and co-hosted by actress Tori Spelling, Olympian Adam Rippon, and comedian Teddy Ray. The series is the fourth spin off of Ridiculousness. The show focuses on the "most debaucherous clips found on the internet – everything from awkward proposals, to nights out gone wrong and cheaters caught red handed. Messyness seeks to celebrate dating, partying and all the messy stages of young adulthood." The series was greenlit in June 2021. It was renewed for a second season for 2022.

Episodes

Series overview

Season 1 (2021–22)

Season 2 (2022)

References

MTV original programming
2020s American video clip television series
2021 American television series debuts
American television spin-offs
Mass media about Internet culture
Internet memes
English-language television shows